The 2010–11 LV Cup (styled as the LV= Cup) was the 40th season of England's national rugby union cup competition, and the sixth to follow the Anglo-Welsh format.

The competition consisted of the four Welsh Magners League teams and the twelve Aviva Premiership clubs arranged into pools consisting of three English and one Welsh team. Teams were guaranteed two home and two away pool matches, with teams in Pools 1 and 4 playing each other and teams in Pools 2 and 3 playing each other. The competition took place on international fixture dates during the Autumn Internationals and Six Nations, thus allowing teams to develop their squad players.

The competition made history this season when London Wasps announced that their Round 3 match against Harlequins would be played in Abu Dhabi on January 30, 2011 – making it the first competitive game between two English clubs to take place abroad.

Gloucester claimed the cup with a comprehensive 34–7 victory over Newcastle Falcons in the final at Franklin's Gardens in Northampton. It was the fifth victory for Gloucester in the competition (including one shared title), and the first since the current Anglo-Welsh format was adopted in 2005.

Pool stages

Points system 
The points scoring system for the pool stages will be as follows:
4 points for a win
2 points for a draw
1 bonus point for scoring four or more tries in a match (TB)
1 bonus point for a loss by seven points or less (LB)

The ranking criteria were:
 If two or more clubs in the same pool end the pool stage equal on match points, then the order in which they have finished will be determined by:
i. the greater number of matches won by the club and
ii. if the number of matches won is equal, the club with the greater total number of tries scored and
iii. if the total number of tries scored is equal, the club with the greater points difference (points scored for, less points scored against) and
iv. if the points difference is equal, the club with the fewer number of red cards and
v. if the number of red cards is the same, by the toss a coin.

Pool 1 v Pool 4

Round 1

Round 2

Round 3

Round 4

Pool 2 v Pool 3

Round 1

Round 2

Round 3

Round 4

Knock–out stage

Qualification criteria 
The top teams from each pool qualify for the knockout stages. The pool winners will be decided by the following criteria:
1. The pool winner will be the club with the highest number of match points in each pool. The pool winners will be ranked 1 to 4 by reference to the number of match points earned in the pools.
2. If two or more clubs in the same pool end the pool stage equal on match points, then the order in which they have finished will be determined by:
i. the greater number of matches won by the club and
ii. if the number of matches won is equal, the club with the greater total number of tries scored and
iii. if the total number of tries scored is equal, the club with the greater points difference (points scored for, less points scored against) and
iv. if the points difference is equal, the club with the fewer number of red cards and
v. if the number of red cards is the same, by the toss a coin.

Each of the four qualifying clubs shall be ranked as above and shall play each other as follows: 
Semi-final 1 – 1st ranked club v 4th ranked club
Semi-final 2 – 2nd ranked club v 3rd ranked club
The first club listed in each of the semi-final matches shall be the home club.

Semi-finals

Final

Touch judges:
Wayne Barnes (England)
Paul Dix (England)

Top scorers

Top points scorers

Top try scorers

See also 
2010–11 English Premiership (rugby union)
2010–11 Celtic League

Notes

External links
 Official website
 Anglo Welsh Cup on Premiership Rugby website
 Tables
 Fixtures and results
 Anglo Welsh Cup website

References

2010–11 in Welsh rugby union
2010–11 English Premiership (rugby union)
2010-11
2010–11 rugby union tournaments for clubs